Sporolactobacillus is a genus of anaerobic, endospore-forming, gram-positive, motile, rod-shaped, lactic acid bacteria.

The genus is unique among lactic acid bacteria given its ability to form spores, and it is therefore more heat resistant than other Lactic acid bacteria. Sporolactobacillus species grow readily at temperatures between 25 and 40 °C. The optimal temperature for growth lies around 35 °C. It was first discovered in chicken feed in the early 1960s, and it is most often observed in soil. Sporolactobacillus can sometimes be found in fermented food products such as fish, olives, or pickles. 

Members of this genus are catalase-negative, do not reduce nitrates to nitrites, and do not form indole. Lactic acid is produced actively without liberation of gas from glucose, fructose, mannose, sucrose, maltose, trehalose, raffinose, inulin, mannitol, sorbitol, and alpha-methylglucoside.

References

External Links 
Sporolactobacillus in Food: Literature Discussing Prevalence and Control

Bacillales
Bacteria genera